Attention bandits! is a 1987 film directed by Claude Lelouch.

Synopsis
A young criminal is framed. During a robbery, a woman is killed, and he is accused of the murder. Sentenced to 10 years in prison, he is after one thing: revenge.

Starring
Jean Yanne: Simon Verini, dit l'Expert
Marie-Sophie L.: Marie-Sophie, dite la Princesse
Patrick Bruel: Julien Bastide, dit Mozart
Charles Gérard: Tonton Charlot
Corinne Marchand: Manuchka
Hélène Surgère: The institution director
Edwige Navarro: Marie-Sophie enfant
Christine Barbelivien: Françoise Verini
Hervé Favre: The fiancé
Ginette Garcin: The maid
Françoise Bette
Jean-Michel Dupuis
Anouchka

External links
 

1987 films
1980s crime films
French crime films
Films directed by Claude Lelouch
Films scored by Francis Lai
1980s French films